Algeria have appeared in the finals of the FIFA World Cup on four occasions in 1982, 1986, 2010 and 2014. They have once qualified for the knockout rounds, reaching the round of 16 in 2014 before losing to Germany. 32 years before, Algeria nearly qualified to the second round of the 1982 World Cup after beating both West Germany and Chile; however, a controversial match between West Germany and Austria wound up eliminating the Algerians. In 2014, Algeria qualified for the first time into the round of 16.

Records

By match

Record by opponent 

* Games of West Germany are counted towards Germany.

Participations

Algeria at Spain 1982 

Group 2

Algeria at Mexico 1986 

Group D

Algeria at South Africa 2010 

Group C

Algeria vs Slovenia

Algeria at Brazil 2014 

Group H

Belgium vs Algeria

South Korea vs Algeria

Algeria vs Russia

Germany vs Algeria

Record players

Goalscorers

Historical performances 
The Algeria team had many records and facts which had done during its participations in the world cup.

 1982: First African team to beat a European team (West Germany)
 1982: First African team to win two games
 1982: First team to win two games in the first round and not advance
 1982: FIFA revised the group system for future tournaments, so that the final two games in each group would be played simultaneously because the controversial game between West Germany & Austria that causes the elimination of Algeria
 1986: First African team to qualify consecutively for the second time
 2014: First African team to score four goals in one game against South Korea
 2014: First African team to reach the knockout stage simultaneously with another African team (Nigeria)

Squads

Notes

References 

 
Countries at the FIFA World Cup
World Cup